Vodo Cadore is a comune (municipality) in the province of Belluno in the Italian region of Veneto, located about  north of Venice and about  north of Belluno, in the mid-Boite valley, between the two Dolomites massifs of Antelao and Pelmo.

References 

Cities and towns in Veneto